Spear is a fictional supervillain appearing in American comic books published by Marvel Comics.

Publication history
Spear first appeared in Power Man #28 and was created by Don McGregor and Frank Robbins. His full name was revealed in Fear Itself: Fellowship of Fear #1.

Fictional character biography
Jasper Daniels is the brother of a convict named Jack Daniels and an unnamed brother who operated as Mangler. When Jack was dying of an inoperable brain tumor, he was a candidate for the "Power Man" experiments. When Jack couldn't survive the early "Power Man" experiments, Spear blamed Dr. Noah Burstein and began developing identities that would serve him in his quest to avenge his brother.

Spear watched Noah Burnstein from the shadows. Noah noticed him, but did not say anything to Power Man.

Spear fired on Dr. Burnstein while he was walking with Luke Cage and Claire Foster so that he can fight with Luke Cage. Despite Luke Cage's best efforts, Spear managed to do a near fatal shot on Dr. Burnstein and escaped. Shortly after the attack, Spear shot a hollow shaft with a message to Dr. Burnstein confirming his attack on him.

Spear later tracked Luke Cage's movements and was on hand to rescue Mangler after an ill-advised attack on Luke Cage. While Mangler distracted Luke Cage, Spear sent another message to Dr. Burnstein and once again decided to let him live. He left a message for him to meet him at the East River pier. When Dr. Burnstein did so, he was speared by Spear in front of Luke Cage's eyes. Two young adults witnessed Spear escaping the pier. Spear then attempted to rescue Mangler from police custody which was thwarted by Luke Cage. Not wanting to lose another son, Spear's mother tipped off Luke Cage and Quentin Chase as to his whereabouts. Luke Cage and Quentin Chase confronted Spear at his tenement apartment. He engaged Luke Cage in a running battle which took to the top of an outbound bus which crashed into the Hudson River. After knocking out Spear, Luke Cage handed him over to the police.

During the Shadowland storyline, Spear appeared as a member of Nightshade's Flashmob (which also consisted of Chemistro II, Cheshire Cat, Comanche, Dontrell Hamilton, and Mr. Fish II) where they attacked Victor Alvarez on a rooftop. Spear was quickly pinned to the wall by Power Man and then knocked out by Luke Cage. Flashmob was remanded to Ryker's Island. Nightshade's solicitor Big Ben Donovan was able to secure Spear's release.

During the Spider-Island storyline, Spear was with Flashmob when they tried to leave a spider-infested Manhattan only to be defeated by Heroes for Hire.

After his brother Mangler is attacked by a gang of "preemptive" vigilantes, Spear and the relatives of other ex-cons who had been assaulted resort to asking the Heroes for Hire for help. The vigilantes crash the meeting followed by the New York City Police Department. In the confusion that follows, Spear is arrested along with Iron Fist. Spear is remanded to Ryker's Island where he reunites with his brother Mangler. Together, the two form a group with Iron Fist and fellow inmates Gamecock and Big Ben Donovan's son Little Ben Donovan.

Powers and abilities
Spear is a skilled marksman where he is an expert with a unique speargun that he created where it fires a variety of unique ammunition like forked spears, incendiary and explosive shafts, and hollow shafts containing messages or gasses. He is also an expert at hand-to-hand combat.

In other media
Spear appears in The Avengers: Earth's Mightiest Heroes episode "To Steal an Ant-Man." He appears as a member of William Cross' gang.

References

External links
 Spear at Marvel Wiki
 Spear at Comic Vine
 

Marvel Comics supervillains
Fictional polearm and spearfighters